Francisco Bermúdez de Pedraza (1585–1655) was a Spanish writer, jurist and historian.

Spanish male writers
People from Granada
1585 births
1655 deaths
Spanish writers